The 2016 FC Akzhayik season is the club's 8th season in the Kazakhstan Premier League, the highest tier of association football in Kazakhstan, and their first since 2010.They will also participate in the Kazakhstan Cup.

Squad

Transfers

Winter

In:

Out:

Trialists:

Summer

In:

 

Out:

Friendlies

Competitions

Kazakhstan Premier League

Regular season

Results summary

Results by round

Results

League table

Relegation round

Results summary

Results by round

Results

League table

Kazakhstan Cup

Squad statistics

Appearances and goals

|-
|colspan="14"|Players away from Akzhayik on loan:
|-
|colspan="14"|Players who appeared for Akzhayik that left during the season:

|}

Goal scorers

Disciplinary record

References

External links
Official VK

FC Akzhayik seasons
Akzhayik